This article lists the results for the Thailand national football team between 2000 and 2009.

 Only record the results that affect the FIFA/Coca-Cola World Ranking. See FIFA 'A' matches criteria.

2000

2001

2002

2003

2004

2005

2006

2007

2008

2009

References
 Football Association of Thailand 
 Thai Football.com
 Thai football page of Fifa.com
 Thai football Blog

2000s in Thai sport
2000